39 Andromedae, abbreviated 39 And, is a double star in the northern constellation Andromeda. 39 Andromedae is the Flamsteed designation. Its apparent visual magnitude is 5.95, which indicates it is near the lower limit on visibility to the naked eye. It is a suspected member of the Ursa Major Moving Group, although King et al. (2003) list it as a probable non-member.

The brighter component is a confirmed Am star with a stellar classification of kA3hA7VmA9. This notation indicates its spectrum displays the calcium K line of an A3 star, the hydrogen lines of an A7 V, or A-type main-sequence star, and the metal lines of an A9 star. It is radiating 40 times the Sun's luminosity from its photosphere at an effective temperature of 8,073 K. As of 2015, the magnitude 12.48 companion star is located at an angular separation of  along a position angle of 3° from the primary.

References

External links
 Image ADS 863

Double stars
Andromeda (constellation)
Durchmusterung objects
Andromedae, 39
006116
004903
0290